Vriesea incurva is a plant species in the genus Vriesea. This species is an epiphyte native to Central America (Costa Rica and Panama), the Greater Antilles (Cuba, Jamaica, Hispaniola), and South America (Colombia, Guyana, Bolivia, Venezuela and Ecuador).

References

incurva
Flora of South America
Flora of Central America
Flora of the Caribbean
Epiphytes
Plants described in 1865
Flora without expected TNC conservation status